Mymensingh-1 is a constituency represented in the Jatiya Sangsad (National Parliament) of Bangladesh since 2016 by Jewel Areng of the Awami League.

Boundaries 
The constituency encompasses Dhobaura and Haluaghat upazilas.

History 
The constituency was created for the first general elections in newly independent Bangladesh, held in 1973.

Ahead of the 2008 general election, the Election Commission redrew constituency boundaries to reflect population changes revealed by the 2001 Bangladesh census. The 2008 redistricting altered the boundaries of the constituency.

Members of Parliament

Elections

Elections in the 2010s 
Promode Mankin died in May 2016. Jewel Areng, his son, was elected in a July by-election.

Promode Mankin was re-elected unopposed in the 2014 general election after opposition parties withdrew their candidacies in a boycott of the election.

Elections in the 2000s

Elections in the 1990s

Notes

References

External links
 

Parliamentary constituencies in Bangladesh
Mymensingh District